Claudia Cretti (born 24 May 1996) is an Italian professional racing cyclist. In 2017 she rode for the Italian Valcar-PBM team. During the 7th stage of the Giro Rosa, Cretti was seriously injured in a crash and was being kept in a medically induced coma. Later that month she was able to communicate. In November 2017 she did ride a bike for the first time. In February 2019 she announced to compete as a paracyclist.

Career results
2013
1st  Junior Women's Scratch, European Track Championships (under-23 & junior)
2014
3rd  Junior Women's Scratch, European Track Championships (under-23 & junior)
2nd  Team Pursuit, 2014 UCI Juniors Track World Championships ( with  Martina Alzini, Maria Vittoria Sperotto and Daniela Magnetto)
2016
2nd  Team Pursuit, UEC European U23 Track Championships (with Martina Alzini, Michela Maltese and Francesca Pattaro)
2nd Scratch Race, 6 giorni delle rose - Fiorenzuola

See also
 List of 2015 UCI Women's Teams and riders

References

External links
 

1996 births
Living people
Italian female cyclists
Place of birth missing (living people)
People from Lovere
Cyclists from the Province of Bergamo